Kimbirila-Nord is a town in north-western Ivory Coast. It is a sub-prefecture of Minignan Department in Folon Region, Denguélé District.

Kimbirila-Nord was a commune until March 2012, when it became one of 1126 communes nationwide that were abolished.

In 2014, the population of the sub-prefecture of Kimbirila-Nord was 4,932.

Villages
The 6 villages of the sub-prefecture of Kimbirila-Nord and their population in 2014 are:
 Kimbirila-Nord  (1 432)
 Konéla  (673)
 Lélé  (737)
 Naguina  (753)
 Sanzanou  (514)
 Tiéfenzo  (823)

References

Sub-prefectures of Folon Region
Former communes of Ivory Coast